FK Viagem Příbram is a Czech football club from Příbram. The club currently plays in the Czech National Football League (2nd tier). It is the legal successor to Dukla Prague, a club which won 11 national league titles between 1953 and 1982.

History 

The team originated from two clubs, the 1966–67 European Cup semi-finalist Dukla Prague, which tradition it carries, and FC Příbram, merged in 1996. Příbram had previously spent two seasons in the second division, having been promoted from the third-tier Bohemian Football League at the end of the 1993–94 season. Dukla Prague, on the other hand, had spent the previous two seasons in the Bohemian Football League after being relegated from the inaugural season of the Czech First League in 1993–94.

The club competed in the 1996–97 Czech 2. Liga, playing home matches at Stadion Juliska in Prague. The club won the league that season and won promotion to the Czech First League. In 1997 the club moved to Příbram, playing its matches at Na Litavce stadium. The club played in the top division, changing its name to FK Marila Příbram in 2000. The club spent ten consecutive seasons in the top flight until being relegated in the 2006–07 season. The club played in the 2007–08 Czech 2. Liga, reaching third place at the time of the mid-season break under manager František Barát. At the end of the season, the club celebrated promotion back to the Czech First League after just one season away. The club changed its name to 1.FK Příbram in 2008. Příbram played in European competition in the 2000 UEFA Intertoto Cup, reaching the third round of the tournament. After finishing fourth in the 2000–01 Czech First League, Příbram again played in Europe, overcoming French side Sedan in the 2001–02 UEFA Cup before losing to Greek side PAOK in the second round of the competition. With new sponsor the club changed its name to FK Viagem Příbram in July 2022.

Historical names 
 1996–1998: FC Dukla
 1998–2000: FC Dukla Příbram
 2000–2008: FK Marila Příbram
 2008–2022: 1. FK Příbram
 2022–    : FK Viagem Příbram

Players

Current squad
.

Out on loan

Notable former players
Had senior international cap(s) for their respective countries. Players whose name is listed in bold represented their countries while playing for Příbram.

 Martin Hašek
 Róbert Jež
 Marek Kulič
 Abdulaziz Al Masha'an
 Marius Papšys
 Horst Siegl
 Luděk Stracený
 Claude Videgla
 Tomáš Zápotočný
 Ruslan Mingazow

Reserves
As of 2022/23, Příbram's reserve team FK Viagem Příbram B plays in Divize A (4th tier of Czech football system).

Player records in the Czech First League
.

Most appearances

Most goals

Most clean sheets

Managers

Karel Jarolím (1997–98)
Josef Csaplár (1998, 2000–01)
Jozef Chovanec (Aug 2002 – Nov 2003)
František Kopač (Nov 2003 – Nov 2004)
Pavel Tobiáš (Dec 2004 – Sep 2006)
František Barát (Sep 2006 – Jan 2007)
Jiří Kotrba (Jan 2007 – Jun 2007)
František Barát (2007 – Apr 2008)
Massimo Morales (Apr 2008 – May 2009)
Petr Čuhel (May 2009 – Jun 2009)
Karol Marko (Jun 2009 – June 2010)
Martin Hřídel (Jun 2010 – Sep 2010)
Roman Nádvorník (Oct 2010 – Apr 2011)
František Kopač (Apr 2011 – May 2011)
David Vavruška (Jul 2011 – Aug 2012)
Karol Marko (Aug 2012 – Mar 2013)
František Straka (Mar 2013 – Oct 2013)
Petr Čuhel (Oct 2013 – Sep 2014)
Pavel Tobiáš (2014–16)
Martin Pulpit (2016)
Petr Rada (Aug 2016 – Jan 2017)
Kamil Tobiáš (Jan 2017 – Jun 2017)
Josef Csaplár (Jun 2017 – Mar 2019)
Roman Nádvorník (Mar 2019 – Feb 2020)
Pavel Horváth (Mar 2020 – Mar 2021)
Jozef Valachovič (Mar 2021 – Nov 2021)
Tomáš Zápotočný (Nov 2021 – Nov 2022)
Dušan Uhrin Jr. (Nov 2022 – present)

History in domestic competitions

 Seasons spent at Level 1 of the football league system: 22
 Seasons spent at Level 2 of the football league system: 5
 Seasons spent at Level 3 of the football league system: 1
 Seasons spent at Level 4 of the football league system: 0

Czech Republic

Club records

Czech First League records
Best position: 4th (2000–01)
Worst position: 17th (2020–21)
Biggest home win: Příbram 5–0 Hradec Králové (2002–03), Příbram 5–0 Jihlava (2013–14)
Biggest away win: Plzeň 0–4 Příbram (2003–04)
Biggest home defeat: Příbram 1–8 Slavia Prague (2016–17)
Biggest away defeat: Jablonec 6–0 Příbram (2013–14)

References

External links
 

 
Football clubs in the Czech Republic
Association football clubs established in 1928
Czech First League clubs
Mining association football clubs in the Czech Republic
1928 establishments in Czechoslovakia
Dukla Prague